Explode is the fourth studio album by the American streetpunk band The Unseen, released on June 3, 2003.

Track listing
"False Hope" (lyrics: Mark music: Scott)
"Your Failure Is My Revenge" (lyrics & music: Tripp)
"Explode" (lyrics: Mark music: Scott)
"Don't Look Back" (lyrics & music: Tripp)
"Negative Outlook" (lyrics: Mark music: Scott)
"Tsunami Suicide" (lyrics: Paul music: Scott)
"So Sick Of You" (lyrics: Mark music: Scott)
"Remains Unseen" (lyrics & music: Tripp)
"Fed Up" (lyrics: Mark music: Scott)
"Useless Regrets" (lyrics & music: Tripp)
"Victims" (lyrics & music: Tripp)
"New World Disorder" (lyrics: Mark music: Scott)

Personnel
Mark - Drums, Vocals
Paul - Guitar, Vocals
Tripp - Bass, Vocals
Scott - Lead Guitar
Pat Melzard - Drums (on tracks 1, 3, 5, 7, 9, & 12)

References

External links
Explode @ discogs.com

2003 albums
The Unseen (band) albums
BYO Records albums